Vinodaythra is a 2007 Indian Malayalam-language comedy drama film written and directed by Sathyan Anthikkad, and starring Dileep, Meera Jasmine and Mukesh with Murali, Innocent, Ganapathi S Poduval, KPAC Lalitha, Nedumudi Venu, Seetha and Parvathy in supporting roles. Few scenes of the movie were reported to be inspired by the 2001 Korean movie My Sassy Girl. The film become blockbuster at the box office,and ran more than 150 days completed in theaters.

Synopsis
It is the story of an irresponsible but good-natured young man, Vinod who comes to a hilly village to live with his elder sister Vimala, brother in law, Shaji and his sister Rashmi. Shaji is an engineer at the irrigation department and Vinod wants to learn life from him, but end up creating problems for Shaji.

Vinod meets a lot of people in the village and learns lessons of life from them, chiefly from Anupama whom he falls in love with.

Cast 

 Dileep as Vinod
 Mukesh as Shaji Raghavan
 Meera Jasmine as Anupama
 Seetha as Vimala
 Murali as Vijayan
 Innocent as Thankachan
 Ganapathi S Poduval as Ganapathi
 Nedumudi Venu as James Matthew
 K.P.A.C. Lalitha as James Mathew's Sister
 Muthumani as School Teacher- cameo appearance
 Parvathy as Reshmi
 Mammukoya as Ananthan
 Vijayaraghavan as Rajappan
 Sreelatha Namboothiri as Soshamma
 Babu Namboothiri as Ramanunni, Vinod's and Vimala's Father
 Reshmi Boban as Ambili
 Bindu Murali
 Sabitha Anand as Anupama's mother
 Manjusha Sajish
 Sethulakshmi as Saree Selling Woman
 Sreekutty as Staff Molly Varghese
 Vijayan Karanthoor as S.I. Stephen

Music

The score and soundtrack of the film are composed by Ilaiyaraaja. The songs are penned by Vayalar Sarathchandra Varma. All songs became chartbusters.

Awards and nominations
Asianet Film Awards
 Asianet Film Award for Best Actress - Meera Jasmine
 Asianet Film Award for Best Child Artist - Ganapathi S Poduval
Kerala State Film Awards
 Kerala State Film Award for Best Screenplay - Sathyan Anthikad
 Kerala State Film Award for Best Choreography - Brinda

References

External links

2007 films
2000s coming-of-age comedy-drama films
2000s Malayalam-language films
Films with screenplays by Sathyan Anthikad
Films directed by Sathyan Anthikad
Films scored by Ilaiyaraaja
Indian coming-of-age comedy-drama films
2007 comedy films
2007 drama films